The 1979 Australian Rally Championship was a series of five rallying events held across Australia. It was the twelfth season in the history of the competition.

Ross Dunkerton and navigator Jeff Beaumont in the Datsun Stanza won the 1979 Championship.

Season review

The twelfth Australian Rally Championship was held over five events across Australia, the season consisting of one event each for New South Wales, Victoria, Queensland, South Australia and Western Australia.  The 1979 season saw the Datsun Stanzas of Dunkerton and Fury regain some of their dominance with the main challenge from the Ford Escort of Greg Carr.

The Rallies

The five events of the 1979 season were as follows.

Round Four – Bega Valley Rally

1979 Drivers and Navigators Championships
Final pointscore for 1979 is as follows.

Ross Dunkerton – Champion Driver 1979

Jeff Beaumont – Champion Navigator 1979

References

External links
  Results of Snowy Mountains Rally and ARC results.

Rally Championship
Rally competitions in Australia
Australian